Prosenitsy is a rural locality (a village) in Denyatinskoye Rural Settlement, Melenkovsky District, Vladimir Oblast, Russia. The population was 36 as of 2010. There are 3 streets.

Geography 
Prosenitsy is located 32 km northeast of Melenki (the district's administrative centre) by road. Gribkovo is the nearest rural locality.

References 

Rural localities in Melenkovsky District